The People's Democratic Party (PDP) is an Egyptian political party of approximately 275 members headed by Ahmed Abdel Azem Kamel. The party is currently frozen. The party fielded one candidate in the 2000 legislative elections.

External links
The People's Democratic Party  State Information Service-Party

1990 establishments in Egypt
Political parties established in 1990
Political parties in Egypt